Frank McPhee (21 October 1948 – 10 May 2000) was a long-time Glasgow gangland boss.

McPhee was reported to have built his "underworld empire" on drugs and robbery. He was jailed in 1978 for five years for robbery and served another five in 1986 for an armed raid. In 1990, he was cleared of involvement in a £42,000 armed raid but was sentenced to eight years for his involvement in a £200,000 drug deal in 1992. In 1997, McPhee was prosecuted for the killing of William "Worm" Toye, who was found stabbed to death in Perth Prison, where McPhee was serving time. A jury found the case not proven. In 1998, three months after his release from prison, McPhee was accused of the murder by strangulation of Chris McGrory, but the case was again found not proven.

It was reported that a £5,000 'contract' had been put out on his life. Police were said to be investigating one theory that McPhee had tried to muscle in on the drug trade controlled by former Irish terrorists. He had been responsible for negotiating between dealers in the North and the rest of England. Police also probed his links with a "plot to make Scotland the dogfighting capital of Europe"; and probed claims that he had been killed by one of two Glasgow gangster families.

In May 2000, he was killed by a single shot to the head from a .22 rifle with telescopic sight outside his home in Guthrie Street, Maryhill, Glasgow, 500 yards from Maryhill Police Station, while his son watched. It was variously reported that a sniper had waited for him after he had been chased through Glasgow by another gunman  and that only one gunman was involved.

References

2000 deaths
People from Maryhill
20th-century Scottish criminals
Scottish gangsters
Deaths by firearm in Scotland
People murdered by British organized crime
1948 births
Criminals from Glasgow